Laßnitz, Lassnitz or Lasnitz,  may refer to:

Places in Austria
 Laßnitz bei Murau (Steirisch Laßnitz), a municipality in Styria
 Laßnitz (Frauental), a cadastral municipality in Frauental an der Laßnitz, Styria
 Laßnitz (Ligist), a settlement in Ligist, Styria
 Laßnitz (Metnitz), a village on the Laßnitzbach stream in the municipality of Metnitz, Carinthia

Historical places
 Tragöß-Oberort, near Bruck an der Mur in Styria, Austria, until the 19th century
 Frauental an der Laßnitz, Styria, Austria, until the mid-20th century
 Laznica (Maribor), village near Maribor, Slovenia
 Laznica (Braničevo), village in the district of Braničevo, Serbia

Rivers in Austria, also called Laßnitzbach, Laßnitz-Bach, Lasnitzen(-bach)
 Rettenbach (Laßnitz), also called the Niedere Laßnitz, West Styria
 Wildbach (Laßnitz), formerly called the Hohe Laßnitz, in West Styria
 Lassnitz (Kainach), in the district of Voitsberg in West Styria
 Lassnitzbach (Mur), in the district of Murau in the Styria and a boundary river of the district of Sankt Veit an der Glan in Carinthia
 Laßnitz (Rabnitz), in East Styria
 Laßnitz (Sulm) (upper course of the Niedere Laßnitz), in West Styria
 Lasnitzen, in the municipality of Prägraten am Großvenediger in the district of Lienz in East Tyrol

See also 
 Laznica, Lößnitz, Loznica (disambiguation)